The Romanian American Football Federation is the governing body of the sport of American football in Romania. Formed in 2010, the federation oversees the Romanian league system, the Romanian Bowl and the national selections.

See also
National American Football Championship of Romania
Romania national American football team

External links
  Romanian American Football Federation 

2010 establishments in Romania
American Football
Romania
American football in Romania
Sports organizations established in 2010